Maurizio Merli (February 8, 1940 – March 10, 1989) was an Italian film actor and a star of many Italian police thrillers.

Career
After a decade of minor film roles, 1974 saw a breakthrough for Merli with his first starring role in a remake of romantic drama Catene, and brought in as lead in the third of a franchise for White Fang to the Rescue, in part due to his resemblance to Franco Nero. However the following year became a true banner one for Merli when he made Violent Rome which was an enormous success, and made him the star of poliziotteschi genre. He went on to make 11 more, two as Commissario Betti, Merli's character in Violent Rome. Betti is a detective who metes out apoplectic violence, and in some way the character was an exploitative imitation of American police thrillers like Dirty Harry and a film of Nero. However, distinctive elements in Violent Rome reflected Italian law enforcement of the era. Similar to Luigi Calabresi, a real life policeman who though morally upright became notorious after being denounced in media for brutality and was assassinated, the character of Betti finds himself a marked man. At the ending of Violent Rome, Betti's now paralyzed in a wheelchair colleague cannot escape the conviction that Betti is fated to have a short future.

Merli appeared in a few international productions and even a comedy, but remained identified with Betti the toughest hero of poliziotteschi. The genre's decline as he moved into middle age meant that his last roles were in lesser productions.

The athletic looking Merli enjoyed participating in sport and was unaware of having any heart trouble, but he died suddenly in 1989 of myocardial infarction after a tennis match.

Partial filmography

The Leopard (1963) - (uncredited)
Due rrringos nel Texas (1967) - Union Soldier (uncredited)
Phenomenal and the Treasure of Tutankhamen (1968) - Pino
Eros e Thanatos (1969) - Giornalista Barni
Decameron proibitissimo (Boccaccio mio statte zitto) (1972) - Cecco - friend of Rinaldo
Le mille e una notte all'italiana (1972)
Catene (1974) - Alfio Capuano
White Fang to the Rescue (1974) - Burt Halloway
Violent Rome (1975) - Commissario Betti
The Tough Ones (1976) - Inspector Leonardo Tanzi
Violent Naples (1976) - Commissario Betti
A Special Cop in Action (1976) - Betti
The Cynic, the Rat and the Fist (1977) - Leonardo Tanzi
Mannaja (1977) - Mannaja
Highway Racer (1977) - Marco Palma
Seagulls Fly Low (1978) - Albert Morgan
Fearless (1978) - Walter 'Wally' Spada
Covert Action (1978) - John Florio
Fear in the City (1978) - Murri
Convoy Busters (1978) - Olmi
The Iron Commissioner (1978) - Commissario Mauro Mariani
From Corleone to Brooklyn (1979) - Lt. Giorgio Berni
Hunted City (1979) - Commissario Paolo Ferro
The Rebel (1980) - Nick Rossi
 (1981) - Mark Spencieri
Priest of Love (1981) - Angelo Ravagli
 (1983) - Peter Wayne
Tango blu (1987) - Walter Mantegazza

References

External links
 

1940 births
1989 deaths
Italian male film actors
Male actors from Rome
20th-century Italian male actors
People of Lazian descent